The 9th Gorkha Rifles is a Gorkha infantry regiment of the Indian Army and, previously, the British Army. The regiment was initially formed by the British in 1817, and was one of the Gurkha regiments transferred to the Indian Army after independence as part of the tripartite agreement in 1947. This Gorkha regiment mainly recruits soldiers who come from Nepal's Gorkhali warrior community i.e. the Khas/Chhetri and Thakuri clans. Domiciled Indian Gorkhas are also recruited, and they form about 20 percent of the regiment's total strength. The 9 Gorkha Rifles is one of the seven Gorkha regiments of the Indian Army. The other regiments are 1 GR, 3 GR, 4 GR, 5 GR (FF), 8 GR and 11 GR.

History

Pre Independence
The history of the 9th Gorkha Rifles dates back to 1817, when it was raised as the "Fatehgarh Levy"; this designation was changed the following year to the "Mynpoory Levy". In 1823, the unit became the 1st Battalion, 32nd Regiment of Bengal Native Infantry, although this only last until 1824 when it was renamed the "63rd Regiment", and was formed as a regular unit as part of the Bengal Native Infantry. After the reorganisations that took place in the aftermath of the Indian Rebellion of 1857, the regiment's designation was changed to the "9th Bengal Native Infantry" in 1861; at this time one of its companies was formed by Gorkhas and the others by hillmen. By then the regiment had fought at Bhartpur and in the difficult Battle of Sobraon in the First Anglo-Sikh War.

By 1893, the regiment became a wholly Gorkha unit of Khas origin, accepting only those who were more closely linked to Hindu ways as compared to the Buddhist ways. In 1903, the regiment was designated as the 9th Gurkha Rifles.

9 GR fought in World War I in Europe, and in the inter war years took part in the operations on the North West Frontier.

Soldiers of the 9 Gorkhas formed part of the command of Brigadier General Reginald Dyer which fired into the crowd at the Jallianwala Bagh Massacre.

In World War II, the regiment's battalions  fought in Malaya, Italy and North Africa. The 3/9 GR and 4/9 GR formed part of the Chindit operations in Burma, and earned a reputation in the long range penetration operations.

Post Independence
India gained its independence in 1947 and 9th Gorkha Rifles was one of six Gurkha regiments (out of 10) allocated to the Indian Army as part of the Tripartite Agreement between Britain, India and Nepal. Since 1947 the regiment has fought in the 1962 Indo-China War, the 1/9 GR fought under the most demanding conditions on the Namka Chu in (Arunachal Pradesh).

The battalions of the regiment were involved in the 1965 and 1971 wars with Pakistan.

Designations

The regiment has existed since 1817 under the following designations:
1817–1819: Fatagarh Levy
1819–1824: Mianpuri Levy
1824–1861: 63rd Regiment of Bengal Native Infantry
1861–1885: 9th Regiment of Bengal Native Infantry
1885–1894: 9th Regiment of Bengal Infantry
1894–1901: 9th (Gurkha Rifle) Bengal Infantry
1903–1947: 9th Gurkha Rifles
1950–present: 9 Gorkha Rifles

Battle honours
The battle honours of the 9th Gorkha rifles are:
Pre-Independence: Bharatpur, Sobraon, Afghanistan (1879–80), Punjab Frontier,
World War I: La Bassee, Festubert, Armentieres, Givenchy, Neuve Chapelle, Aubers, Loos, France and Flanders, Tigris, Kut-al-Amara, Mesopotamia,
World War II: Malaya (1941–42), Djebel El Meida, Djebel Garci, Ragoubet Souissi, North Africa (1940–43), Cassino I, Hangman's Hill,  Tavoleto, San Marino, Italy (1943–45), Chindits 1944, Burma (1942–45).
Indo-Pak Conflict 1965: Phillora, Punjab 1965
Indo-Pak Conflict 1971: Kumarkhali, East Pakistan 1971, Jammu and Kashmir 1971, Dera Baba Nanak, Punjab 1971

Uniforms
As the 9th Regiment of Bengal Infantry red coats with yellow facings were worn. In 1894 the newly renamed 9th (Gurkha Rifles) Bengal Infantry were issued with what was to become the standard Gurkha parade and cold weather uniform of rifle green, with puttees, silver insignia, black metal buttons and black facings. The headdress was a round black Kilmarnock cap with a badge of crossed kukris over the numeral 9. Pipers for the 1st Battalion wore a green plaid while the 2nd Battalion were granted the Duff clan tartan by a colonel of that name. The broad brimmed "Kashmir" slouch hat was adopted by the 9th Gurkha Rifes in July 1902. It continued in use with khaki drill service dress as general wear by all ranks in winter and summer, between the two world wars.

Victoria Cross recipients
Major (later Lt. Colonel) George Campbell Wheeler, 2nd Battalion, 23 February 1917, River Tigris, Mesopotamia.
Temp. Major Frank Gerald Blaker, Highland Light Infantry, attached to 3rd Battalion, 9 July 1944, Taunggyi, Burma (now Myanmar).
Rifleman Sher Bahadur Thapa, 1st Battalion, 18 September 1944, San Marino, Italy.

Notable members
 John Bradburne, (1921–1979), afterwards the "Vagabond of God".
 Stafford Beer, operation research theorist who served as an officer with the regiment from 1945-7.
 M N Rai, a colonel who received the Yudh Seva Medal for bravery and Shaurya Chakra posthumously.
 Bernard Dineen, (1923-2013), afterwards an award winning journalist for The Yorkshire Post.
 Lt. Gen. B. K. N. Chhibber, later governor of Punjab and administrator of Chandigarh.
 Lieutenant General Anil Kumar Bhatt, PVSM, UYSM, AVSM, SM, VSM was Director General Military Operations (DGMO) at Army Headquarters, Commander of Chinar Corps at Srinagar (J&K) and Military Secretary at Army Headquarters.

References
Citations

Bibliography

Further reading

External links
 9th Gurkhas

Military units and formations established in 1817
Infantry regiments of the Indian Army from 1947
British Indian Army infantry regiments
Rifle regiments
Gurkhas
1817 establishments in British India
R
R